The 1980–81 season was the 35th season in Rijeka’s history and their 19th season in the Yugoslav First League. Their 10th place finish in the 1979–80 season meant it was their seventh successive season playing in the Yugoslav First League.

Competitions

Yugoslav First League

Classification

Results summary

Results by round

Matches

First League

Source: rsssf.com

Yugoslav Cup

Source: rsssf.com

Squad statistics
Competitive matches only.

Notes
1. Rijeka’s Milan Ružić was sent off when the result was 1–1. The referee abandoned the match following the scuffle that ensued. The match was voided and awarded 3–0 to Vardar. Ružić was suspended for six months.

See also
1980–81 Yugoslav First League
1980–81 Yugoslav Cup

References

External sources
 1980–81 Yugoslav First League at rsssf.com
 Prvenstvo 1980.-81. at nk-rijeka.hr

HNK Rijeka seasons
Rijeka